{{Infobox video game
|title=Mario Tennis Open
|image=mariotennis.jpg
| alt = Mario Tennis Open
|caption = Packaging artwork released for all territories
|developer= Camelot Software Planning
|publisher=Nintendo
|director=Shugo Takahashi
|producer=Hiroyuki TakahashiShugo Takahashi
|designer=Hiroyuki TakahashiShugo Takahashi
|artist=Fumihide Aoki
|composer=Motoi Sakuraba
|series=Mario Tennis
|platforms=Nintendo 3DS
|released={{Video game release|NA|May 20, 2012|JP/AUS|May 24, 2012|EU|May 25, 2012<ref>{{cite web |url=http://www.nintendolife.com/news/2012/02/mario_tennis_open_served_to_europe_on_25th_may |title=Mario Tennis Open' Served to Europe on 25th May |website=Nintendo Life |date=February 22, 2012 |accessdate=February 22, 2012}}</ref>|HK|April 12, 2013|KO|April 18, 2013}}Nintendo eShopNintendo Selects
|genre=Sports
|modes=Single-player, multiplayer
}}

 is a Mario sports game developed by Camelot Software Planning and published by Nintendo for the Nintendo 3DS. The game was developed by Camelot, the company that produced most of the previous Mario Tennis titles. The game was first released on May 20, 2012 in North America and in other regions the same month. It was later released as a downloadable title on the Nintendo eShop in late 2012 and Nintendo Selects in 2015/2016.

Like the earlier Mario Tennis titles, Mario Tennis Open incorporates characters, settings, and scenarios from the Mario franchise. Players can engage in standard tennis matches but also play special variants with different rules and objectives. Twenty-four distinct playable characters are available, each with special qualities that are used to the players' advantage. Mario Tennis Open is also the first Mario Tennis game to feature simultaneous online play.Mario Tennis Open received mixed to positive reviews, gaining aggregate scores of 69.54% on GameRankings and 69 on Metacritic.

GameplayMario Tennis Open features variants of tennis matches, played either in singles or doubles. Different shots (lobs, slices, and dropshots) can be executed with different button combinations or by selecting them from the Nintendo 3DS touch screen. In addition, the player can use the 3DS gyroscope to turn the in-game camera by rotating the entire console during gameplay. Mario Tennis Open does not feature any RPG elements, unlike the previous handheld games Mario Tennis and Mario Tennis: Power Tour.Mario Tennis Open features twenty-four playable Mario characters, with four being unlocked by accomplishing specific tasks, and eight more being unlocked by scanning certain QR codes. Each character possesses a pre-determined skill, such as advantages in speed, offense, or defense. Mii characters saved in the Nintendo 3DS Mii Maker are also selectable. Unlike the Mario characters, Mii characters' skills vary and are customizable, determined by the tennis gear the player equips. The gear options are purchased using coins that are awarded after playing each game mode. However, costumes are obtained by completing certain objectives.Mario Tennis Open supports both online and local wireless multiplayer, allowing up to four players to play simultaneously on separate Nintendo 3DS consoles. When a player's Nintendo 3DS console comes in contact with another via StreetPass, he will be able to play against a computer-controlled opponent whose play style mimics that of the other player, provided that the other console also contains Mario Tennis Open save data.

ReceptionMario Tennis Open has received mixed to positive reviews, with aggregate scores of 69.26 percent on GameRankings and 69 on Metacritic. Nintendo Power scored Mario Tennis Open'' 7.0 out of 10 in its May 2012 issue. Game Informer gave the game an 8 out of 10 while Nintendo World Report gave it a 7.5 out of 10.

As of August 12, 2012, the game has sold 280,000 copies in Japan. As of March 31, 2013, the game has worldwide sales of 1.11 million.

References

External links
Mario Tennis Open American site
Mario Tennis Open Japanese site
Mario Tennis Open Australian site
Mario Tennis Open European site

2012 video games
Camelot Software Planning games
Video game sequels
Nintendo 3DS games
Nintendo 3DS eShop games
Nintendo 3DS-only games
Nintendo Network games
Mario Tennis
Tennis video games
Video games developed in Japan
Video games scored by Motoi Sakuraba
Multiplayer online games
Multiplayer and single-player video games